A Luce Scholar is a recipient of a cultural exchange and vocational fellowship sponsored by the Henry Luce Foundation, a private foundation established by Time, Inc. founder Henry R. Luce.

The program
Founded in 1974, The  Luce Scholars Program   provides stipends and professional placements for eighteen young Americans to live and work in Asia each year.  The program's purpose is to increase awareness of Asia among future leaders in American society.

Those who already have significant experience in Asia or Asian studies are not eligible for the Luce Scholars Program. Candidates must be American citizens who have received at least a bachelor's degree and are no more than 30 years old by June 20 of the year they enter the program. Candidates may be nominated by one of 75 colleges and universities.

After interviews with the foundation's staff, finalists meet with one of three selection panels who choose the eighteen Luce Scholars. Placements and support services for the Luce Scholars are provided by the Asia Foundation, an organization with field offices throughout Asia. Placements can be made in many countries in East and Southeast Asia:

Notable Luce Scholars
Terry B. Adamson  (Emory University, 1975), Executive Vice President, National Geographic Society 
Scott Ageloff (Carnegie Mellon University, 1978), Dean, New York School of Interior Design
Robert Butkin (University of Pennsylvania, 1978), State Treasurer, Oklahoma
Robert S. Dohner (Harvard University, 1974), Director, East Asia Office, United States Department of the Treasury
Gary Edson (Stanford University, 1977), Deputy National Security Advisor to President George W. Bush
Paul Gigot, Editor of the Editorial Page, The Wall Street Journal
David Grogan (Williams College, 1975), Deputy Editor, Discover Magazine
David Huebner (Princeton, Yale JD), current U.S. Ambassador to New Zealand and Samoa
Justin Hughes (Oberlin College, 1988) William H. Hannon Professor of Law, Loyola Law School 
Camara P. Jones (Wellesley College, 1976) physician and epidemiologist, former President of American Public Health Association, Senior Fellow Morehouse School of Medicine
John E. Marcom (Princeton, 1979), Senior Vice President, Yahoo 
Jonathan S. Miller (Yale, 1975), General Manager, American Repertory Theatre
Alan Murray (University of North Carolina Chapel Hill, 1977), former Washington Bureau Chief, CNBC, Executive Editor, the Wall Street Journal, President of Pew Research Center
Richard Read (Amherst College, 1980), Pulitzer Prize winner, 1999, 2001. Staff writer Los Angeles Times
Michael L. Riordan (Washington University in St. Louis, 1979), founder and former CEO and Chairman, Gilead Sciences
Lynn Sharp (Smith College, 1976), John G. McLean Professor of Business Administration, Harvard Business School
Robert Zoellick (Swarthmore College, 1975), President, World Bank and former Trade Secretary and Deputy Secretary of State
Robert Spinner (MIT, Chair of Neurosurgery, Mayo Clinic, Rochester, MN
Steve Spinner (Wesleyan College, 1991), Adviser to Obama Campaign, Founder Sports Potential
Meghan O'Sullivan (Georgetown University, 1991), Senior fellow, Harvard University's John F. Kennedy School of Government</ref> Belfer Center for Science and International Affairs, former White House Deputy National Security Adviser on Iraq and Afghanistan
Joshua Freedman  (Stanford University, 2014), Economic Growth Fellow at the New American Foundation  and Forbes contributor  on the political economics of higher education 
Nirav D. Shah (University of Chicago JD 2007, MD 2008), director, Maine Center for Disease Control and Prevention

References

External links
 Henry Luce Foundation website
 Luce Scholars webpage

Awards established in 1974
Scholarships in the United States